The men's 3000 metres steeplechase event at the 1997 Summer Universiade was held at the Stadio Cibali in Catania, Italy on 31 August.

Results

References

Athletics at the 1997 Summer Universiade
1997